Ram Strauss (born 28 April 1992), is an Israeli association footballer who p currently unemployed after most recently playing for Maccabi Ahi Nazareth.

Early and personal life
Strauss was born in moshav Yokneam Moshava, Israel, to a family of Ashkenazi Jewish descent. His brother Sagi Strauss is a former association footballer as well.

His sister Alvit Strauss married Argentine association footballer Roberto Colautti in 2005, and on account of their marriage Colautti became an Israeli citizen in 2007 and played for the Israel national football team, as well as four daughters together.

References

1992 births
Living people
Israeli footballers
Israel under-21 international footballers
Maccabi Ironi Bat Yam F.C. players
Maccabi Ahi Nazareth F.C. players
Hapoel Ramat Gan F.C. players
Nea Salamis Famagusta FC players
Hapoel Tel Aviv F.C. players
Hapoel Ironi Kiryat Shmona F.C. players
ACS Poli Timișoara players
Oud-Heverlee Leuven players
Hapoel Nof HaGalil F.C. players
Hapoel Acre F.C. players
Liga Leumit players
Israeli Premier League players
Cypriot First Division players
Liga I players
Challenger Pro League players
Israeli expatriate footballers
Expatriate footballers in Belgium
Expatriate footballers in Cyprus
Expatriate footballers in Romania
Israeli expatriate sportspeople in Belgium
Israeli expatriate sportspeople in Cyprus
Israeli expatriate sportspeople in Romania
Association football goalkeepers
Israeli Ashkenazi Jews
Jewish footballers